Abaucourt-Hautecourt is a commune in the Meuse department in the Grand Est region of north-eastern France.

The inhabitants of the commune are known as Abaucourtois or Abaucourtoises.

Geography
Abbaucourt-Hautecourt is located on the Highway D603 which transects the commune from south-east to north-east about 8 km north-east of Verdun. Highway D114 also transects the commune from north to south. Both Highways intersect in the village of Abaucourt. The commune consists entirely of farmland.

Neighbouring communes and villages

Villages and Hamlets
Broville: north of the D603.
Eix-Abaucourt a small row of houses on the south side of the D603 midway between Eix and the village of Abaucourt.
Hautecourt south of the D603.

History
In the 1970s, Abaucourt-lès-Souppleville joined Hautecourt-lès-Broville to form a new joint commune called "Abaucourt-Hautecourt".

Administration

List of Successive Mayors of Abaucourt-Hautecort

Population

Sites and Monuments
German Military Cemetery No. 7885 (1914-1918)
War Memorial

Religious Buildings
The commune does not have a church.

Notable people linked to the Commune
Lieutenant René Dorme, a famous aviator of the First World War.

See also
 Communes of the Meuse department

References

External links

Abaucourt-Hautecourt on Géoportail, National Geographic Institute (IGN)  website 
Abaucourt & Hauteceurt on the 1750 Cassini Map

Communes of Meuse (department)
Recipients of the Croix de Guerre 1914–1918 (France)